Fatou Tiyana (born February 24, 1987) is a track and field sprint athlete who competed internationally for the Gambian Olympic team.

Tiyana represented the Gambia at the 2008 Summer Olympics in Beijing. She competed at the 100 metres sprint and placed seventh in her heat without advancing to the second round. She ran the distance in a time of 12.25 seconds.

References

External links
 

1987 births
Living people
Gambian female sprinters
Olympic athletes of the Gambia
Athletes (track and field) at the 2008 Summer Olympics
Olympic female sprinters